The University of Granada (UGR) is a public university located in the city of Granada, Spain, and founded in 1531 by Emperor Charles V. With more than 60,000 students, it is the fourth largest university in Spain. Apart from the city of Granada, UGR also has campuses in Ceuta and Melilla.

In the academic year 2012/2013 almost 2,000 European students were enrolled in UGR through the Erasmus Programme, making it the most popular European destination. The university's Center for Modern Languages (CLM) receives over 10,000 international students each year. In 2014, UGR was voted the best Spanish university by international students.

History 
In 1526 a college was founded in Granada by Holy Roman Emperor Charles V for the teaching of logic, philosophy, theology and canon law.  On 14 July 1531, the establishment of a studium generale with the faculties of theology, arts and canon law was granted by a papal bull by Clement VII, marking the birth hour of the university. This explains its motto "Universitas Granatensis 1531" and his official seal, based in its founder coat of arms with representations of the imperial double-headed eagle and Spanish kingdoms.

The rectorate of the university of Granada is situated in the Royal Hospital of Granada, inaugurated in 1526 as well during the reign of Holy Roman Emperor Charles V and listed nowadays as BIC in the Spanish heritage classification.

Recent major new facilities include the Granada Health Science Technological Park, housing infrastructures and facilities devoted to its four main uses: teaching (98,000 m2), health care (120,000 m2), and research and business development (170,000 m2), with the participation of Spanish CSIC institution.

Rankings

According to several rankings, the University of Granada ranks among top ten best Spanish universities and holds first place in Translation and Interpreting studies. It is also considered the national leader in Computer Science Engineering. UGR also plays a major role in scientific output, placing high in national ranks and being one of the best world universities in computing and mathematics studies.

Centres and Qualifications 
UGR is composed of 5 Schools, 22 Faculties and 116 Departments responsible for teaching and researching into specific subject areas. They are spread over five different campuses in the city of Granada (Centro, Cartuja, Fuentenueva, Aynadamar and Ciencias de la Salud), plus two more campuses located in the cities of Ceuta and Melilla, Spanish territories in Northern Africa.

Centres located in Granada 

 School of  Building Engineering
 School of Architecture
 School of Civil Engineering
 School of Information Technology and Telecommunications
 Faculty of Fine Arts
 Faculty of Sciences
 Faculty of Sport Sciences
 Faculty of Economics and Business
 Faculty of Education
 Faculty of Political Science and Sociology
 Faculty of Health Sciences
 Faculty of Labour Studies
 Faculty of Communication and Documentation
 Faculty of Law
 Faculty of Pharmacy
 Faculty of Philosophy and Humanities
 Faculty of Medicine
 Faculty of Dentistry
 Faculty of Psychology
 Faculty of Social Work
 Faculty of Translation and Interpreting

Campus located in Ceuta 
 Faculty of Health Sciences
 Faculty of Education and Humanities

Campus located in Melilla 
 Faculty of Social Sciences
 Faculty of Education, Economy and Technology
 Faculty of Nursing
The University of Granada also offers a wide range of postgraduate programmes (Master's Degrees, Doctorate Programmes and UGR's Postgraduate studies), made up of studies adapted to the European model.

School for Modern Languages
The UGR began admitting international students in 1992 with the founding of the School for Languages (Centro de Lenguas Modernas). As of 2009–2010, there were some 5,000 international students, including Erasmus programme exchange students from the European Union. The CLM has agreements with 20 universities and study abroad organizations in the U.S. and in Canada in order to bring North Americans to the UGR, including the American Institute For Foreign Study, Arcadia University, International Studies Abroad and the University of Delaware.

Notable alumni 
Francisco de Paula Martínez de la Rosa, Spanish statesman and dramatist.
Julián Sanz del Río, philosopher, jurist, and educator. He brought Kraussism to Spain.
Pedro Antonio de Alarcón y Ariza, novelist, journalist, and politician.
Nicolás Salmerón y Alonso, President of the First Spanish Republic
Manuel Gómez-Moreno Martínez, archeologist, and historian.
Francisco Javier Simonet y Baca, orientalist, Arabist, and historian.
Federico Olóriz Aguilera, doctor, anthropologist, and criminologist.
Angel Ganivet, Spanish writer precursor to the Generation of '98 and ambassador in Helsinki.
Fernando de los Ríos Urruti, prominent politician during Second Spanish Republic
Niceto Alcalá-Zamora, President of the Second Spanish Republic
Melchor Almagro San Martín, writer, diplomat, and politician.
Francisco Villaespesa Martín, modernist poet.
Alejandro Sawa, bohemian, and writer.
Blas Infante, father of Andalusian nationalism
Melchor Fernández Almagro, literary critic, historian, journalist, and politician.
Federico García Lorca, man of letters from the Spanish Generation of '27
José Fernández Montesinos, literary critic, and university professor.
Américo Castro, cultural and intellectual historian, literary critic, and university professor.
Frederick Forsyth, British author.
Juan Francisco Casas, Spanish artist.
José de Salamanca, Marquis of Salamanca, Spanish businessman and politician.
Joaquín Sabina, Famous poet, singer and composer
Juan Carlos Rodríguez Gómez, literary theorist, literary critic, and university professor.
Antonio Carvajal Milena, poet, and university professor.
Luis Lloréns Torres, Puerto Rican poet
Antonio Muñoz Molina, writer and former director of Instituto Cervantes of New York City
Pablo Heras-Casado, Spanish conductor.
Andrés Neuman, Spanish-Argentine writer, and journalist.
Gabriella Morreale de Escobar, chemist and medical researcher.
Antonio Vidal-Puig, medical doctor and scientist.
Juan Pizarro Navarrete, physician and politician.

See also 
 List of early modern universities in Europe

References

External links

Official site of the University of Granada
Center of Modern Languages Site
English language magazine for the region
GRE/GMAT/ TOFEL

 
1531 establishments in Spain
Educational institutions established in the 1530s
Universities and colleges in Spain
Universities in Andalusia